Wyandot (also spelled Wyandotte) or Waⁿdat is the Iroquoian language traditionally spoken by the people known as Wyandot or Wyandotte, descended from the Tionontati. It is considered a sister to the Wendat language, spoken by descendants of the Huron-Wendat Confederacy. It was last spoken, before its revival, by members located primarily in Oklahoma, United States and Quebec, Canada. Linguists have traditionally considered Wyandot as a dialect or modern form of Wendat.

Wyandot essentially died out as a spoken language with the death of the last native speaker in 1972, though there are now attempts at revitalization. The Wyandotte Nation of Oklahoma is offering Wyandot language classes in the Wyandotte Public Schools, grades K–4, and also at the Wyandotte Nation's preschool "Turtle-Tots" program. The Huron-Wendat Nation of Quebec is offering adult and children's classes in the Wendat language at its village school in Wendake. The Wyandotte Nation of Oklahoma Language Committee has created online language lessons for self-study.

History

Relationship to Wendat
Although it is traditionally equated with or seen as a dialect of the Iroquoian Wendat (Huron), Wyandot became so differentiated as to be considered a distinct language. This change appears to have happened sometime between the mid-eighteenth century, when the Jesuit missionary Pierre Potier (1708–1781) documented the Petun dialect of Wendat in Canada, and the mid-nineteenth century. By the time the ethnographer Marius Barbeau made his transcriptions of the Wyandot language in Wyandotte, Oklahoma, in 1911–1912, it had diverged enough to be considered a separate language.

Significant differences between Wendat and Wyandot in diachronic phonology, pronominal prefixes, and lexicon challenge the traditional view that Wyandot is modern Wendat. History suggests the roots of this language are complex; the ancestors of the Wyandot were refugees from various Huronian tribes who banded together to form one tribe. After being displaced from their ancestral home in Canada on Georgian Bay, the group traveled south, first to Ohio and later to Kansas and Oklahoma. As many members of this group were Petun, some scholars have suggested that Wyandot is more influenced by Petun than by its descent from Wendat.

The work of Marius Barbeau was used by linguist Craig Kopris to reconstruct Wyandot; he developed a grammar and dictionary of the language. This work represents the most comprehensive research done on the Wyandot language as spoken in Oklahoma just prior to its extinction (or its "dormancy" as modern tribal members refer to it).

Phonology

Consonants
The phonemic inventory of the consonants is written by using the orthography used by Kopris in his analysis, which was based on Barbeau's transcriptions. The orthographic symbol is written in angled brackets where it differs from the IPA. Kopris listed places of articulation for the consonants but noted that the distinction had not been made by Barbeau. 

The presence of a single voiced stop, contrasting with the voiceless stop , makes Wyandot unusual among Iroquoian languages, as it is the only one with a phonemic voicing distinction. The /r/ sound is pronounced as [ɹ] rather than [r], according to researchers who phonetically transcribed directly from fluent speakers and described it as "corresponding to the English r" and as "the smooth English sound, never vibrant." Although the two largely appear to be in free variation, they clearly contrast in some cases (as in the minimal pairs da "that; the; who") and na ("now; then").

Another unique feature of Wyandot is the presence of the voiced fricative , creating an - contrast, but there is no corresponding - contrast. The phoneme  also has no voiced counterpart.

Consonants may appear in clusters. Word-initial consonant clusters can be up to three consonants long, medial clusters up to four consonants long, and final clusters up to two consonants long.

Vowels
Barbeau's original transcriptions contained great detail and a complex system of diacritics, resulting in 64 different vowel characters. By eliminating allophones, Kopris found six phonemes, in addition to the marginal phoneme .

Other analysis of the same Barbeau data suggests that vowel length is contrastive in Wyandot, like in other Iroquoian languages.

Phonototactics
A Wyandot syllable consists of a vowel as the nucleus, a coda, and an optional onset. Onset clusters of two consonants are possible, with a single triconsonantal cluster (/skw/) occurring only in the first syllable of a word. Codas may consist of up to two consonants. This gives a maximal Wyandot syllable structure of CCCVCC, where C represent a consonant, and V represents a vowel.

Orthography
Wyandot is written in the Latin script, with the additional character  representing a glottal stop. The majority of characters represent their IPA values, with a few exceptions. A colon  indicates a long vowel (e.g.). As in the IPA, a raised  indicates prenasalization of stops (e.g.). Some allophones of consonants are explicitly indicated (e.g.).

Wendat use a similar orthography, with some differences. To disambiguate nasal vowels from oral vowels followed by /n/, the latter have diaeresis over the vowel (e.g.). Glottal stops are written with an apostrophe. Consonantal allophones are not explicitly indicated.

Sample vocabulary

Seten - Stop, used on road signs (with arrêt) in some Huron reserves, such as Wendake in Quebec.
Skat - One
Tindee - Two
Shenk - Three
Anduak - Four
Weeish - Five
Sandustee - Water
Kanata - Village 
"änen'enh" [a-NEN'-enh] - Mother

Wyandot and Wendat today
Members of the Wyandotte Nation, whose headquarters is in Wyandotte, Oklahoma, are promoting the study of Wyandot as a second language among its people as part of a cultural revival. Since 2005, Richard Zane Smith (Wyandot) has been volunteering and teaching in the Wyandotte schools with the aid of the linguist Kopris.

Linguistic work is also being done on the closely related Wendat. The anthropologist John Steckley was reported in 2007 as being "the sole speaker" (non-native) of Wendat. Several Wendat scholars have master's degrees in Wendat language and have been active as linguists in the Wendat community in Quebec. In Wendake, Quebec, the First Nations people are working on a revival of Wendat language and culture. The language is being introduced in adult classes and into the village primary school. The Wendat linguist Megan Lukaniec has been instrumental in helping to create curriculum, infrastructure, and materials for Wendat language programs.

The Wyandot language is used in the television series Barkskins.

See also

Gabriel Sagard, Le grand voyage and Dictionnaire de la langue huronne (Dictionary of the Huron Language), 17th century
John Steckley, ed. (2009). Dictionary of the Huron Language 
For an example of Wyandot(te) language revitalization work, see an online lesson:    "Wyandotte", Southern Oklahoma University

Notes

References 
 Barbeau, Marius. (1960). "Huron-Wyandot Traditional Narratives: In Translations and Native Texts." National Museum of Canada Bulletin 165, Anthropological Series 47.
 Haldeman, Samuel Stehman. (1847). "On the Phonology of the Wyandots". Proceedings of the American Philosophical Society 4: 268–269.
 Julian, Charles. (2010). A History of the Iroquoian Languages. Winnipeg, Canada: University of Manitoba dissertation. 
 Kopris, Craig. (1999). "Wyandot Phonology: Recovering the Sound System of an Extinct Language". Proceedings of the Second Annual High Desert Linguistics Society Conference 2: 51–67.
 Kopris, Craig. (2001). A Grammar and Dictionary of Wyandot. Buffalo, NY: SUNY dissertation. 
 Steckley, John L. (1988). "How the Huron Became Wyandot: Onomastic Evidence," Onomastica Canadiana 70: 59–70.

Sources
Native-languages.org: Wyandot words
Language page of the Wyandotte Nation

Language
Northern Iroquoian languages
Indigenous languages of the North American eastern woodlands
First Nations languages in Canada
Indigenous languages of Oklahoma
Extinct languages of North America
Native American language revitalization